Jonathon Tyler Power (born August 9, 1974) is a retired professional squash player from Canada. In 1999, he became the first North American squash player to reach the World No. 1 ranking. He won 36 top-level squash events during his career, including the World Open in 1998, and the British Open in 1999.

Career overview
Power began playing squash at the age of seven and turned professional at age 16. After joining the Professional Squash Association (PSA) Tour in May 1991, he went on to win 36 PSA tournaments, and appeared in 58 finals. Career highlights included winning the World Open (1998), the British Open (1999), the Super Series Finals (2003 & 2005), the PSA Masters (2001, 2002 & 2005), the Tournament of Champions (1996, 1999, 2000 & 2002), and the men's singles Gold Medal at the 2002 Commonwealth Games.

Power is considered to be one of the greatest shotmakers in the history of the game, having perfected a wide range of drop shots and deception shots. He was often a crowd favourite, partly because of his emotional outbursts and verbal exchanges with referees, which sometimes led to him being compared with John McEnroe. Power's rivalry with Scotland's Peter Nicol was one of the most famous and extended in the history of the game.

In January 2006, Power returned to the World No. 1 ranking, four-and-a-half years after the previous time he was ranked in the top spot (marking the longest gap between periods of holding the World No. 1 ranking of any player in history). He lost the No. 1 ranking in February 2006 to David Palmer, but regained it again on 1 March 2006. One day later, on 2 March, Power announced his retirement from professional squash. His wife, Sita, gave birth to their daughter named Parker on January 23, 2007.

Power played for Canada at the 2007 and 2009 World Team Championships. He defeated several highly ranked players and showed he was still competitive at world level. He also won the 2008 Canadian Championships, defeating Shahier Razik in the final.

World Open final appearances

British Open final appearances

Commonwealth Games final appearances

External links
 Jonathon Power as a professional coach to Diego Elias
 
 
 Page at Squashpics.com
 SquashTalk article on Power's retirement
 SquashSite article on Power's retirement
 BBC article on Power's retirement
 Photo tribute at Squashphotos.com
 Bruce Grierson article "Court Jester" on Power's rise

1974 births
Living people
Canadian male squash players
Commonwealth Games gold medallists for Canada
Commonwealth Games silver medallists for Canada
Commonwealth Games medallists in squash
Medalists at the 1995 Pan American Games
Pan American Games silver medalists for Canada
Pan American Games medalists in squash
People from Comox, British Columbia
Racket sportspeople from British Columbia
Racket sportspeople from Ontario
Sportspeople from Toronto
Squash players at the 1995 Pan American Games
Squash players at the 1998 Commonwealth Games
Squash players at the 2002 Commonwealth Games
Medallists at the 1998 Commonwealth Games
Medallists at the 2002 Commonwealth Games